The St. Louis Cardinals 1998 season was the team's 117th season in St. Louis, Missouri and the 107th season in the National League.  The Cardinals went 83-79 during the season and finished 3rd in the National League Central division, 18 games behind the Houston Astros.  First baseman Mark McGwire broke Roger Maris' single-season home run record this season by hitting 70 home runs, battling with the Chicago Cubs' Sammy Sosa, who finished runner-up in the National League with 66.

Offseason
 December 5: Signed free agent outfielder Willie McGee.
 January 8:  Signed free agent pitcher Kent Bottenfield.
 March 30:  Traded Craig Shipley to the Anaheim Angels for Chip Hale.

Regular season
 On May 8, McGwire hit career home run number 400 in his 4,726th at bat, faster than any other player in history who reached 400 home runs.
 Facing Liván Hernández on May 16, McGwire hit his longest home run of the season, estimated at 545 feet.
 McGwire hit home run number 50 of the season on August 20, becoming the first Major League ballplayer in history with three consecutive 50-plus home run seasons.
 McGwire broke Roger Maris' 37-year-old record of 61 home runs on September 8 with a low line drive over Busch Stadium's left field fence.  Known for hitting many long home runs, it was ironically the shortest home run McGwire hit that season.

Opening Day lineup
 Royce Clayton, SS
 Delino DeShields, 2B
 Mark McGwire, 1B
 Ray Lankford, OF
 Brian Jordan, OF
 Ron Gant, OF
 Gary Gaetti, 3B
 Tom Lampkin, C
 Todd Stottlemyre, P

Season standings

Record vs. opponents

Notable transactions
 June 2: Drafted J. D. Drew in the 1st round with the 5th pick of the 1998 amateur draft.  Player signed July 3, 1998.
 April 14:  The Cleveland Indians selected David Bell off waivers.
  July 31:  Traded Todd Stottlemyre and Royce Clayton to the Texas Rangers for Darren Oliver, Fernando Tatís and a player to be named later.  The Rangers sent Mark Little on August 9 to the Cardinals to complete the trade.
 August 16: Released catcher Tom Pagnozzi.

Scorecard for McGwire's 70th
Entering the game on September 27 against the Montreal Expos, McGwire had 68 home runs.  In  the third inning, McGwire hit a home run off of Mike Thurman, and in the seventh, he got number 70 off of Carl Pavano.  The ball was caught by Philip Ozersky. In January 1999, Todd McFarlane purchased Mark McGwire's 70th home run ball from the 1998 season for a record $3 million.

September 27, Busch Stadium, St. Louis, Missouri

Aftermath of the 1998 home run chase
A section of Interstate 70 running through downtown St. Louis was renamed "The Mark McGwire Highway."  His record stood until Barry Bonds hit 73 in 2001.   In years following, revelations of the anabolic steroids scandals have possibly tainted these records, but at the time it was great theater and was largely responsible for drawing many fans back to the game after the 1994 players' strike, which had angered and alienated many of them.

Roster

Player stats

Batting

Starters by position
Note: Pos = Position; G = Games played; AB = At bats; R = Runs; H = Hits; HR = Home runs; RBI = Runs batted in; Avg. = Batting average; SB = Stolen bases

Other batters
Note: G = Games played; AB = At bats; R = Runs; H = Hits; HR = Home runs; RBI = Runs batted in; Avg. = Batting average; SB = Stolen bases

Pitching

Starting pitchers
Note: G = Games pitched; IP = Innings pitched; W = Wins; L = Losses; ERA = Earned run average; SO. = Strikeouts; BB = Bases on balls

Other pitchers
Note: G = Games pitched; IP = Innings pitched; W = Wins; L = Losses; ERA = Earned run average; SO = Strikeouts; BB = Bases on balls

Relief pitchers
Note: G = Games pitched; IP = Innings pitched; W = Wins; L = Losses; SV = Saves; ERA = Earned run average; SO = Strikeouts; BB = Bases on balls

McGwire's 70

Awards and honors
 Mark McGwire, Franchise Record, Most Home Runs in One Season (70)
 Mark McGwire, Major League Baseball Home Run Champion
Mark McGwire, Major League record, Most home runs through July 31 (45)
 Mark McGwire, First player to hit 50 home runs in three straight seasons: 1996–1998 
Mark McGwire, Associated Press Athlete of the Year
Mark McGwire, First Base, Silver Slugger Award
Mark McGwire, Sports Illustrated Sportsman of the Year

All-Star Game
Mark McGwire, first base, starter

Farm system

References

1998 St. Louis Cardinals at Baseball Reference
1998 St. Louis Cardinals at Baseball Almanac
 Mark McGwire's 70 Home Runs on Baseball Almanac

St. Louis Cardinals seasons
20th century in St. Louis
St. Louis Cardinals season
Saint Louis Cardinals